Electraphonic Recording is a recording studio and record label located in Memphis, Tennessee.

History 

Electraphonic Recording was established in 2005 by producer and composer Scott Bomar following an agreement to work as composer on Craig Brewer's Hustle & Flow. Initially functioning as a studio, Electraphonic became a label with the 2006 release of Night Full of Sirens: Anthology '93-'97, a compilation of material from the band Impala. Bomar continued to grow the business in the months and years that followed with a focus on bolstering the vintage Memphis soul sound. In 2007, Electraphonic moved into a downtown Memphis studio space with vintage analog equipment including an MCI 416B recording console and a Scully 280 1" 8-Track Tape Machine plus ProTools and other modern software.

Currently, Electraphonic operates from Sam Phillips Recording as a venue for music, film, and television recording.

Music 

Among Electraphonic's more notable releases, Cyndi Lauper entered the studio for a two-week span in 2010 and emerged with the Grammy-nominated Memphis Blues album, which featured B.B. King, Allen Toussaint, Charlie Musslewhite, Johnny Lang, and Ann Peebles. The album was #1 on the Billboard Blues chart for 13 weeks.

Other projects include a multitude of releases by Bomar's multi-generational R&B outfit The Bo-Keys, two full-length albums by Memphis-based organ-soul trio The City Champs, and recordings with Jay Reatard, Jack Yarber, Willem Maker, and Jason Mraz's Grooveline Horns, among others.

TV & Film 

Electraphonic has also hosted a variety of TV and film projects, including the Emmy-winning I Am A Man: From Memphis, A Lesson in Life, MTV's $5 Cover series, Craig Brewer's Black Snake Moan and Academy Award -winning Hustle & Flow, Soul Men (featuring Anthony Hamilton’s Grammy-nominated "Soul Music"), Giancarlo Esposito's Gospel Hill, and the Kevin Smith supported Losers Take All.

Equipment

References

External links
 

Recording studios in Tennessee